Reading University Boat Club (RUBC, boat code RDU) is the rowing club for the University of Reading in the United Kingdom. It is based at a boat house in Christchurch Meadows on the River Thames in the Reading suburb of Caversham. The club has a focus on sculling. It has consistently been one of the more successful university rowing clubs in Britain, including topping the medal table at the BUCS regatta in 2011 and at the BUCS small boats head in 2014 and 2015, as well as wins at Henley Royal Regatta in 1986, 2008, 2009, 2010, 2011 and 2013, and is considered one of the top six university rowing clubs in the UK. A number of former members have competed at the Olympics, including double gold-medallists James Cracknell and Helen Glover. The club has organised the Reading University Head of the River race since 1935.

History
The club was founded in 1892, when the university was established as an extension college of Oxford University. They originally shared a boathouse with other clubs, but got their own boathouse in the 1930s. The Reading Head of the River Race, organised by RUBC, has been held since 1935 (with a break for the second world war), attracting well over 100 crews in 2000. The boathouse burnt down in 1989, destroying a number of boats worth around £150,000. The current boathouse was built in 1992. The Ortner Boat Club is a club for alumni of RUBC, founded in 1997 and named after former Reading University coach Frank Ortner.

Notable alumni
 Cath Bishop won silver at the Athens 2004 Olympic Games.
 James Cracknell won gold at the Sydney 2000 and Athens 2004 Olympic Games.
 Adrian Ellison won gold at the Los Angeles 1984 Olympic Games.
 Debbie Flood won silver at the Athens 2004 and Beijing 2008 Olympic Games.
 Helen Glover won gold at the London 2012 and Rio 2016 Olympic Games.
 Alex Gregory rowed at the London 2012 and Rio 2016 Olympic Games.
 Garry Herbert won gold at the Barcelona 1992 Olympic Games.
 Stewart Innes rowed at the Rio 2016 Olympic Games.
 Sam Townsend rowed at the London 2012 and Rio 2016 Olympic Games.

Honours

Henley Royal Regatta
RUBC have been frequent competitors at the Henley Royal Regatta, which is held around 10 km downriver from Reading.

Queen Mother Challenge Cup - winner 2010 (with Leander Club), 2011 (with Leander Club), 2013 (with Leander Club)
The Stewards' Challenge Cup - 2009 (with Leander Club); Coxless Fours - winner 1986
The Princess Grace Challenge Cup - winner 2008 (with Wallingford Rowing Club)
Visitors Challenge Cup - finals 1984; semi-finals 1974, 1977, 1994, 1996
Prince of Wales Challenge Cup - semi-finals 2010
Thames Challenge Cup - semi-finals 1948
Ladies Plate - semi-finals 1970, 1979
Wyfolds Challenge Cup - semi-finals 1987

British Championships
1987 Ltw Men 4- 
2007 Open 4-, Women 1x 
2009 Open 2x, Open Ltw 2x, Open U23 1x
2010 Open U23 1x 
2011 Women 8+ 
 2014 Open 4x 
 2015 Women 2x

University Sport
BUCS Small Boats Head - Top of Medal Table 2014, 2015
BUCS Regatta - Top of medal table, 2011
BUSA Regatta - Second in Victor Ludorum, 2006

Reading Head of the River Race
The Reading University Head of the River race has been run since 1935 and is the largest student-organised public sporting event in the country, drawing a record 237 crews in 2015. It is run over a 4.6 km course on the Thames between Mapledurham lock and Caversham lock. Major prizes are the Roe Challenge Cup for the fastest crew overall, the Coronation Cup for the fastest Senior III crew, the Bourne Cup for the fastest school, and the Mackintosh Trophy for the fastest British University crew.

References

Rowing clubs in England
University and college rowing clubs in the United Kingdom
Sports clubs established in 1892
Sport in Reading, Berkshire
Rowing clubs of the River Thames